Shelach can mean:

Salat, the five daily ritual prayers that Muslims offer to Allah (God)
Shlach, the 37th weekly parshah or portion in the annual Jewish cycle of Torah reading and the fourth in the book of Numbers

See also 
Shelah (disambiguation)